The T20 Blast, currently named the Vitality Blast for sponsorship reasons, is a professional Twenty20 cricket competition for English and Welsh first-class counties. The competition was established by the England and Wales Cricket Board (ECB) in 2003 as the first professional Twenty20 league in the world. It is the top-level Twenty20 competition in England and Wales.

The competition has been known by a variety of names due to commercial sponsorship. It was known as the Twenty20 Cup from 2003 to 2009,  the Friends Provident t20 and Friends Life t20 from 2010 to 2013, and the  Natwest t20 Blast from 2014 to 2017. The competition has been sponsored by insurance company Vitality since 2018 and is known as the Vitality Blast.

History
When the Benson & Hedges Cup ended in 2002, the ECB needed another one-day competition to fill its place. In response to dwindling crowds and reduced sponsorship the decision was made to launch a 20 over competition with the aim of boosting the game's popularity, particularly with the younger generation. The intention was to deliver fast-paced, exciting cricket which was accessible to fans who were put off by the longer versions of the game.

The first Twenty20 Cup was held in 2003 and was marketed with the slogan "I don’t like cricket, I love it" – a line from the cricket-themed pop song Dreadlock Holiday by 10cc.

Twenty20 Cup 
The first official Twenty20 Cup matches were played on 13 June 2003. The first season of Twenty20 in England was a success, with the Surrey Lions defeating the Warwickshire Bears by nine wickets in the final to win the first Twenty20 Cup Final. On 15 July 2004 Middlesex versus Surrey (the first Twenty20 Cup game to be held at Lord's) attracted a crowd of 26,500, the largest attendance for any county cricket game other than a one-day final since 1953.  The tournament saw six different winners in its seven years.

By the end of the 2009, the ECB had decided to implement a larger competition for the T20 format of the game. The Twenty20 English Premier League was a proposed cricket league to be run by the ECB consisting of the 18 county teams and two overseas teams divided into two divisions with promotion and relegation. The proposal was influenced by the success of the Indian Premier League and by Allen Stanford who had organised the Stanford Super Series in the Caribbean. After the collapse of Stanford's series the proposals were scrapped. Instead a modified 40 over league, the Clydesdale Bank 40 was implemented.

Friends Provident/FriendsLife T20
The Friends Provident T20 (renamed the FriendsLife T20 after just one season) was introduced in 2010. The competition initially divided the eighteen counties into North and South groups, before reverting to the previous model of three divisions of six teams. This period of Twenty20 cricket in England and Wales saw Leicestershire and Hampshire becoming the most successful sides, and in 2013 Northants won their first trophy for two decades.

NatWest T20 Blast
NatWest became the tournament sponsors in 2014, renewing a longstanding relationship the bank had with the county game. The first year of the tournament saw 700,000 spectators attend the games, the most in the competition's history. The tournament was won in 2014 by the Birmingham Bears, Warwickshire County Cricket Club's name for the purposes of Twenty20 cricket, making it the first time a county trophy had been won by a team using a city name. The final victors of this branding of the tournament in 2017 were Notts Outlaws.

Vitality Blast
Vitality became the tournament sponsors in 2018 after signing a deal to become the title partner for four years.

Competition format
The 18 first-class counties compete for the title, initially playing in two or three geographical divisions, the number varying across the years. In 2018, matches were moved to be played in a block during July and August with the aim of attracting large crowds during the school summer holidays. In seasons with three divisions the top two teams in each division and the two best third place teams qualify for the playoff stage, in seasons with two divisions the top four teams in each division qualify for the playoff stage, with a set of quarter-finals leaving four teams in the competition. 

The two semi-finals and the final are played on one finals day at Edgbaston in September. In 2020, due to the delay in the start of the season because of the COVID-19 pandemic matches started on 27 August in a three division format, with the quarter finals played on 1 October and the semi-finals and finals on 4 October (postponed due to rain on the third).

Two division format

Northern Division
Derbyshire Falcons
Durham
Lancashire Lightning
Leicestershire Foxes
Northamptonshire Steelbacks
Notts Outlaws (Nottinghamshire)
Birmingham Bears (Warwickshire)
Worcestershire Rapids
Yorkshire Vikings

Southern Division
Essex Eagles
Glamorgan
Gloucestershire
Hampshire Hawks
Kent Spitfires
Middlesex
Somerset
Surrey
Sussex Sharks

Three division format

Northern Division
Derbyshire Falcons
Durham
Lancashire Lightning
Leicestershire Foxes
Notts Outlaws (Nottinghamshire)
Yorkshire Vikings

Central Division
Glamorgan
Gloucestershire
Northamptonshire Steelbacks
Somerset
Birmingham Bears (Warwickshire)
Worcestershire Rapids

Southern Division
Essex Eagles
Hampshire Hawks
Kent Spitfires
Middlesex
Surrey
Sussex Sharks

Winners

Finals day has been held annually towards the end of the English cricket season.

Performance by county

References

 
English domestic cricket competitions
Twenty20 cricket leagues
Sports leagues established in 2003
Recurring sporting events established in 2003
Professional cricket leagues
Professional sports leagues in the United Kingdom
NatWest t20 Blast